Crazy Peak, elevation , is the highest peak in the Crazy Mountains, an isolated range of the Montana Rockies, in the United States. Crazy Peak is also the most topographically prominent peak in Montana. A small glacier exists on the northeast slope of the mountain. The mountain is located on private land within the Gallatin National Forest.


See also

List of mountain peaks of North America
List of mountain peaks of the United States
List of Ultras of the United States

References

External links

Mountains of Montana
Mountains of Sweet Grass County, Montana